Gurpal Singh (born 13 June 1980) is an Indian shooter who is very hardworking shooter since now & won the silver medal at the 2014 Commonwealth Games in the 50 m pistol event.

References

Living people
1980 births
People from Bathinda
Indian male sport shooters
Commonwealth Games silver medallists for India
Commonwealth Games medallists in shooting
Sport shooters from Punjab, India
Shooters at the 2014 Commonwealth Games
Medallists at the 2014 Commonwealth Games